"The Pitch" is the 43rd episode of the sitcom Seinfeld. It is the third episode of the fourth season. It aired on September 16, 1992. Its original airing was as part of a one-hour episode, with "The Ticket" as the second half. In this episode, NBC executives express interest in Jerry doing a TV series, so Jerry and George work on a pitch for the proposed show. At NBC, Jerry inadvertently tips off "Crazy" Joe Davola that Kramer is having a party without having invited him.

Plot
NBC executives approach Jerry after his comedy act and ask him to come up with an idea for a TV series. George decides he can be a sitcom writer and comes up with the idea of it being "a show about nothing". Kramer trades Newman a radar detector for a helmet. Later Newman receives a speeding ticket due to the detector being defective.

While waiting to meet the NBC executives, George and Jerry meet "Crazy" Joe Davola, a writer and "total nut" who goes to the same therapist as Elaine, Dr. Reston. Jerry, desperately searching for conversation, says he will see him at a party Kramer is having. When it becomes apparent that Joe knows nothing about it and was not invited, Jerry makes a hasty and unsuccessful attempt to backtrack.

George becomes more and more nervous about the impending meeting. Jerry tries to calm him down by building him up. In the meeting, George argues with the executives about his proposed premise ("a show about nothing"; no plot, no stories). It does not go over well with them and when they show displeasure, George refuses to compromise on the idea. Jerry later blasts George for his actions.

George starts a relationship with one of the executives, Susan Ross. When George brings her to Jerry's apartment, Kramer drinks spoiled milk and vomits on her. Crazy Joe Davola, upset at not being invited to Kramer's party, attacks Kramer, kicking him in the head. However, Kramer was wearing Newman's helmet at the time, which saves him any visible injury. When Kramer tells Jerry this, he warns him that Joe says he is looking for Jerry as well. Dr. Reston went to Europe with Elaine, so no one is making sure Joe takes his medication.

Production
In syndication, this episode does not feature Jerry's stand-up routine and also uses Season 3's logo at the beginning, as is also the case in "The Ticket", "The Cheever Letters", and "The Virgin". Both this and "The Ticket" were originally broadcast as a one-hour episode, but are shown separately in syndication.

The primary storyline about Jerry and George co-creating the show Jerry was a tongue-in-cheek homage to the process that Jerry Seinfeld and Larry David experienced when co-creating the show Seinfeld. In the Season 4 DVD extra documentary called "The Breakthrough Season", Jason Alexander and Castle Rock Entertainment executive Glenn Padnick discussed their initial skepticism about using this idea in not only one episode but as an arc for an entire season. Alexander found it to be "insane" and "self-aggrandized". Padnick described the arc about the Jerry show as "inside baseball on a show that most people didn't know even existed."

Critical reception
Linda S. Ghent, Professor in the Department of Economics at Eastern Illinois University, discusses this episode in view of the asymmetric information dramatized. Ghent explains:

The Pew Charitable Trusts weighed in on this episode, naming telemarketing one of the contributors to "rudeness in America".

References

External links

Seinfeld (season 4) episodes
1992 American television episodes
Television episodes written by Larry David